Aiden Wagner (born 14 June 1994 in Wamuran) is an Australian motorcycle racer. He last competed at international level in the 2017 Supersport World Championship aboard a Honda CBR600RR.

Career statistics

Grand Prix motorcycle racing

By season

Races by year

Supersport World Championship

Races by year

External links

1994 births
Living people
Australian motorcycle racers
Moto2 World Championship riders
Supersport World Championship riders
FIM Superstock 1000 Cup riders